The Olympic Conference was an IHSAA-sanctioned conference located within Delaware, Fayette, Jay, and Madison counties. The conference was formed in 1971 by second (and third) high schools from Anderson, Kokomo, and Muncie, and also included suburban Indianapolis schools that grew too large for their conferences at the time. Many suburban schools ended up outgrowing the Olympic as well, with former members now in the Metropolitan and Hoosier Crossroads "superconferences," as the two contain many of the largest schools in the state.

While hosting ten schools in two divisions at its largest, the conference spent the 2000s with five members, then four after Huntington North joined the North Central Conference. With the closing of Anderson Highland after the 2009-2010 school year, as well as the possibility that Muncie Southside will close and be consolidated into Muncie Central in 2011, the conference decided to disband. Connersville joined the Eastern Indiana Conference in 2013, while Jay County joined the Allen County Athletic Conference in 2014. Southside remained open as an independent school until 2014

Former members

Conference Divisions, 1997-2000

Membership timeline

Resources 
 IHSAA Conferences
 IHSAA Directory

Indiana high school athletic conferences
High school sports conferences and leagues in the United States
Indiana High School Athletic Association disestablished conferences